Gange Gowri is a 1967 Indian Kannada-language film,  directed and produced by B. R. Panthulu. The film stars Rajkumar, Bharathi, Leelavathi and K. S. Ashwath. The film has musical score by T. G. Lingappa. The movie was remade in Tamil by B. R. Panthulu himself in 1973 as Ganga Gowri.

Cast

Rajkumar as Lord Shiva (Shivappa"Margabantu"/Astrologer Samayabantu)
Bharathi as Gange
Leelavathi as Dakshayani, Parvathi(Gowri)
K. S. Ashwath as Narada
Narasimharaju as Subrahmanya(Subbanna)
M. P. Shankar as Shanishvara
Krishna Shastry
Hanumantha Rao
Rajesh
Dinesh
Lakshmayya
Narayan
Anantharam Maccheri
D. S. Thanthri
Papamma
B. Jaya
Rama
Premalatha

Plot
The film encompasses the story of Daksha yajna. It depicts how the daksha yajna was desecrated following the jumping into the fire by Lord Shiva's wife Dakshayani. Following this, Lord Shiva marries Goddess Parvati. Later, the Devatas Shiva, Ganga, Gowri all take birth as avatars on earth in the city of Kashi. Eventually, Shiva, Gowri and Ganga all get married in their earthly avatars.

Soundtrack
The music was composed by T. G. Lingappa.

References

External links
 

1967 films
1960s Kannada-language films
Films scored by T. G. Lingappa
Films directed by B. R. Panthulu
Kannada films remade in other languages